Grevillea pachylostyla, commonly known as Buchan River grevillea, is a species of flowering plant in the family Proteaceae and is endemic to Victoria in Australia. It is a mounded to almost prostrate shrub with divided leaves, the end lobes triangular, and usually down-curved, more or less toothbrush-like clusters of cream-coloured flowers that turn` pink to red after opening.

Description
The edges of the leaves curve downwards and the lower surface is densely hairy.

Taxonomy
Buchan River grevillea was first formally described in 1985 by Donald McGillivray who gave it the name Grevillea willisii subsp. pachylostyla in his book New Names in Grevillea (Proteaceae) from specimens collected by James Hamlyn Willis in 1964. In 1994, Peter Olde and Neil Marriott raised the subspecies to species status as Grevillea pachylostyla in The Grevillea Book. The specific epithet (pachylostyla) means "thick pillar", referring to the thickened style.

Distribution and habitat
Grevillea pachylostyla grows on rocky granite outcrops near streams in the upper catchment of the Buchan River in north-eastern Victoria.

Conservation status
This grevillea is listed as "critically endangered" under the Victorian Government Flora and Fauna Guarantee Act 1988 and as "Rare in Victoria" on the Department of Sustainability and Environment's Advisory List of Rare Or Threatened Plants In Victoria.

References

pachylostyla
Flora of Victoria (Australia)
Proteales of Australia
Taxa named by Donald McGillivray
Plants described in 1985